George Challis (1889-1965) was an Australian rugby league footballer who played for the Annandale, Eastern Suburbs and Balmain clubs in the New South Wales Rugby League(NSWRL) competition.

Playing career
Challis played for the Eastern Suburbs club in the years (1914–1916) and (1920). A , Challis was a member of the Eastern Suburbs sides that won City Cups in 1914, '15 and 1916. Challis joined the Balmain club at the end of the 1916 season only to return to the club for 1 final season in 1920.

Challis is recognised as being the 72nd player to wear the red, white and blue of the Eastern Suburbs club. In Challis's 4 seasons at the club he scored 6 tries, and 1 goal for a total of 20 points.

In 1913, Challis was a member of the first NSW  representative side to tour New Zealand. In the 1915 season Challis was again selected to represent NSW in 2 interstate matches against Queensland.

References

External links
 

1889 births
1965 deaths
Annandale rugby league players
Australian rugby league players
Sydney Roosters players
Balmain Tigers players
Rugby league players from New South Wales
Rugby articles needing expert attention
Rugby league halfbacks
Rugby league fullbacks